Sandra María Jessen (born 18 January 1995) is an Icelandic footballer who plays as a midfielder for Þór/KA and the Icelandic national football team. She won the Icelandic championship with Þór/KA in 2012 and 2017 and was named the Úrvalsdeild kvenna Player of the Year in 2018.

Club career
In February 2016, Sandra joined Bayer Leverkusen on loan for the rest of the 2015–16 Frauen-Bundesliga season. She rejoined Þór/KA in May 2016.

On September 28, 2017, she won the Icelandic championship with Þór/KA after defeating FH, in the last game of the season, 2–0 with goals from herself and Sandra Stephany Mayor.

On January 4, 2018, Sandra joined Slavia Praha on loan until the end of April. She is scheduled to return before the start of the 2018 Úrvalsdeild kvenna season.

On 22 September 2018, Sandra was voted as the Úrvalsdeild kvenna Player of the Year.

In January 2019, Sandra signed with Bayer Leverkusen.

In January 2022, Sandra signed back with Þór/KA.

Honours

Titles
 Úrvalsdeild kvenna: 
Winner: 2012, 2017
 Icelandic Women's Super Cup: 
Winner: 2013
 Icelandic Women's Cup: 
Runners-up 2013

Awards
  Úrvalsdeild kvenna Player of the Year
 2018

References

External links 
 
 

1995 births
Living people
Sandra Jessen
Sandra Jessen
Sandra Jessen
Women's association football midfielders
Bayer 04 Leverkusen (women) players
Expatriate women's footballers in the Czech Republic
Expatriate women's footballers in Germany
Icelandic expatriates in Germany
Icelandic expatriates in the Czech Republic
Sandra Jessen
Sandra Jessen
SK Slavia Praha (women) players
Czech Women's First League players
Frauen-Bundesliga players
UEFA Women's Euro 2017 players